Gennady Nikolayevich Timchenko (also spelled Guennadi Timtchenko; born 9 November 1952) is a Russian oligarch and billionaire businessman. He founded and owns the private investment firm Volga Group. Previously he was a co-owner of Gunvor Group.

Timchenko has been close friends with Russian leader Vladimir Putin since the early 1990s. In 1991, Putin gave Timchenko an oil export license. Timchenko subsequently founded Gunvor, which would go on to export billions of dollars-worth of Russian oil.

Timchenko's investment firm Volga Group is a major shareholder in the natural gas giant Novatek. The Pandora Papers leaks revealed that a Timchenko firm, which played a key role in the Novatek investment, obtained massive loans through anonymous offshore shell companies. Timchenko was sanctioned by the US over Russia's 2014 annexation of Crimea. He faced further sanctions just before the February 2022 invasion of Ukraine by the UK government.

As of March 2022, Timchenko was ranked 205th on the Bloomberg Billionaires Index, with an estimated fortune of US$10.3 Billion and making him the sixth richest person in Russia. He is known for being the Chairman of the Board of Directors of the Kontinental Hockey League, and President of the SKA Saint Petersburg ice hockey club. He is a citizen of Russia, Finland and Armenia.

Early life and education
Timchenko was born in Leninakan, Armenian SSR, Soviet Union (now Gyumri, Armenia), in 1952. His father was in the Soviet military and served in the Second World War. He spent 6 years of his childhood (from 1959 to 1965) in the German Democratic Republic (and learnt German) and in the Ukrainian SSR. In 1976, he graduated from the Mechanical Institute of Saint Petersburg, then named Leningrad, as an electrical engineer, according to a 2008 interview with the Wall Street Journal.

Career
In 1977, Timchenko started to work as an engineer for the Izhorsky plant near Saint Petersburg, which specialized in building power generators. He was then moved to the trade department of this state-owned company.

From 1982 to 1988, he worked as a senior engineer of the Ministry of Foreign Trade. In 1988, when Russia started to liberalize its economy, he was promoted to Deputy Director of state-owned oil company Kirishineftekhimexport, which had been created in 1987 based on the Kirishi refinery, one of the three largest refineries in the RSFSR.

In 1991, Timchenko decided to leave Russia and was hired by a Finland-based company, Urals Finland Oy, specializing in importing Russian oil to Europe. He settled in Finland and became a Finnish citizen. While Anatoly Sobchak was in exile, Timchenko was the link between Sobchak and Vladimir Putin.

In 1995, Urals Finland Oy was renamed International Petroleum Products Oy (IPP), and Timchenko became first deputy and then CEO of IPP OY. In 1997, he co-founded the global commodity trading company Gunvor with Swedish businessman Torbjörn Törnqvist. He sold Törnqvist his stake in March 2014, a day before the US sanctions.

In 2007, Timchenko founded the Volga Group (Volga Resources Group) private investment fund. Volga group holds his Russian and international assets in the energy, transport, infrastructure, financial services and consumer sectors.

Gunvor

Timchenko was the co-founder (together with Torbjörn Törnqvist) of Gunvor Group, a corporation registered in Cyprus, and operating in trading and logistics related to the international energy market. On 19 March 2014, Timchenko sold his stake in Gunvor to the other co-founder, Torbjörn Törnqvist. The sale was made the day before Timchenko was included on the United States sanctions list in the wake of the annexing of Crimea by Russia. Timchenko said he had sold his stake in anticipation of "potential economic sanctions" and to "ensure with certainty the continued and uninterrupted operations of Gunvor Group". The value of the transaction was not disclosed.

Volga Group

In 2007, Timchenko founded the Luxembourg-based fund Volga Resources. The fund, which consolidates Timchenko's assets, was renamed in June 2013 as Volga Group and introduced at the Saint Petersburg International Economic Forum. He noted that, for the next few years, his group will focus on the development of infrastructure projects in Russia.

The purpose of this fund is "based on direct and indirect investments in value-driven assets in Russia and internationally that produce consistent, long-term returns". The group owns assets in the energy, transportation and infrastructure development, as well as financial services, consumer goods and real estate. Its most notable investments are in gas company Novatek and petrochemical company Sibur.

Airfix Aviation
In April 2014, Timchenko sold a 49% stake in the Finnish company IPP Oy, which owned 99% of the Finnish aviation company Airfix Aviation. It was a small part of the Volga Group portfolio. Timchenko was subject to international sanctions after the Russian annexation of Crimea in April 2014.

IPP Oil Products (Cyprus) closely associated with Timchenko is under sanctions. Kai Paananen, a partner of Timchenko, is closely associated with both Airfix Aviation and the IPP companies.

Volga Group has been listed by the US Dept of Treasury (OFAC - Office of Foreign Assets Control) as a SDN (specially Designated Nationals) in the Ukraine-related sanction lists of 2014.

Sanctions
In March 2014, following the Crimean status referendum, the U.S. Treasury put Timchenko on the Specially Designated Nationals List (SDN), a list of individuals sanctioned as “members of the Russian leadership’s inner circle.” The sanctions freeze any assets he holds in the US and ban him from entering the United States. Timchenko is on the list of Russian "oligarchs" named in the CAATSA unclassified report.

On 22 February 2022, the UK government announced sanctions on Timchenko after Russia recognised the independence of the Donetsk and Luhansk people's republics and deployed troops to the republics. On 28 February 2022, in relation to the 2022 Russian invasion of Ukraine, the European Union blacklisted Timchenko and had all his assets frozen. On March 4, 2022 the Italian police seized his yacht Lena in the port city of Sanremo. The yacht was also placed on a United States sanctions list along with his wife and daughter.

Personal life and citizenship
Timchenko is married to Elena. They have three children. , Timchenko lives in Moscow, Russia, while his family resides in Switzerland. His daughter Ksenia is married to Gleb Frank, son of Putin's former transport minister Sergey Frank.

In a The Wall Street Journal interview, Timchenko said that in 1999 he gave up Russian citizenship and became a Finnish citizen.

In 2004, the Helsingin Sanomat wrote that he acquired Finnish citizenship, and that he lived in Geneva at that time.
In an October 2012 interview with the Russian edition of Forbes, Timchenko said that he had both Russian and Finnish citizenships. In August 2014, Timchenko said in an interview with ITAR-TASS that he needed Finnish citizenship to travel in the 1990s, when it was harder to travel on a Russian passport, and that he never concealed having two passports. He said that, over the past fourteen years, he had been paying taxes in Switzerland and, prior to that, in Finland. "I scrupulously transfer to Russia the monies I owe to the Russian budget. In theory, I could have cut down the transfers citing the rule on inadmissibility of dual taxation but I never did this – I realized the proceeds that my monies were going off in wages to Russian doctors, teachers, and the military while I was not going to go bankrupt under any circumstances. I wouldn’t get poor if I shared the budget with others." The US Department of Treasury announcement of individuals under sanctions due to the 2014 Crimean crisis lists him as the citizen of Russia, Finland, and Armenia.

Wealth
According to Forbes magazine, Timchenko is one of the wealthiest people in Russia and the world:

According to the Russian publication RBC, in 2012 Timchenko's worth was estimated at $24.61bn.

In addition to business assets, Timchenko, according to media reports, also owns a property in Geneva, Switzerland, which consists of just over 1 ha of land, an internal area of 341m². According to the Land Registry Office of Geneva, the purchase price of the property was SFR 8.4m (at the time of purchase in 2001 – about US$11m). He purchased the yacht Lena for $18 million in 2009.

His income, according to the Finnish tax authorities, increased tenfold from 1999 to 2001. In 2001, he declared an income of EUR 4.9m. Because of his high taxes, Timchenko moved to Switzerland in 2002.

In June 2022, Forbes estimated his net worth at $23.1 billion, making him the 64th richest individual in the world.

Investigation
In November 2014, The Wall Street Journal reported that the US Attorney's Office for the Eastern District of New York is examining allegations about transactions in which Gunvor Group bought oil from Russia's OAO Rosneft and sold it to third parties through the US financial system, which could have been illegal. Gunvor released a statement on 6 November denying any crime.

Sport business
In July 2013, together with the brothers Arkady Rotenberg and Boris Rotenberg, Timchenko established Arena Events Oy, which bought 100% of Helsinki's Hartwall Areena. They also bought a stake in Jokerit, the six-time national champion of the Finnish top-level ice hockey league Liiga. Consequently, Jokerit transferred to the Kontinental Hockey League for the 2014–15 season and they play in the Western Conference in Bobrov division. They also own the large sport hall Hartwall Areena in Helsinki.

Public activities and philanthropy
In 1998, Timchenko co-founded the Yawara-Neva Judo Club.

In 2007, Timchenko and the company Surgutex founded the Kluch charitable foundation, which develops professional foster homes in Leningrad, Tambov and Ryazan regions. In 2008, Gennady and Elena Timchenko founded the Neva Foundation in Geneva, in order to promote and finance cultural projects in Switzerland and Russia. The foundation has focused on lyrical art and a partnership with the Grand Théâtre de Genève. Renowned Saint Petersburg Philharmonic conductor Yuri Temirkanov has been a trustee.

In 2010, Gennady and Elena Timchenko created the Ladoga Foundation. The main activity of the fund has been providing help for the elderly, as well as the restoration of spiritual and cultural heritage monuments, support for cultural projects and project support in the field of modern medical technology. In September 2013, the Ladoga Foundation was renamed to the Elena and Gennady Timchenko Foundation (or just Timchenko Foundation for short), consolidating all their charitable activities.

In 2011, Timchenko was elected Chairman of the Economic Council of the Franco-Russian Chamber of Commerce (CCIFR). The same year, he was also appointed Chairman of the Board of Directors and President of SKA Saint Petersburg, the leading ice hockey team. In 2012, he was appointed Chairman of the Board of Directors of the Continental Hockey League (KHL).

He serves on the board of trustees of the Jewish Museum and Tolerance Center in Moscow and is a member of the Board of Trustees of the Russian Geographical Society.

In 2020 Timchenko donated 2,9 billion rubles to help fight the COVID-19 pandemic

Sports and hobbies
Timchenko likes to play and watch tennis. Through his formerly-owned Finnish company, IPP, he has sponsored an outdoor tennis tournament in Finland since 2000, the IPP Open. According to unconfirmed reports he funded the Finnish national team in the Davis Cup and has sponsored a number of Russian tennis players.

The media has mentioned him sponsoring a sailing team which participates in the international RC44 yachting competition.

In April 2011, Timchenko replaced Alexander Medvedev as Chairman of the Board of Directors of SKA Saint Petersburg, the Saint Petersburg-based ice hockey club. In May of the same year, under the new management structure of the club, he was appointed as Club President. In July 2012, he replaced Vyacheslav Fetisov as Chairman of the Board of Directors of the Continental Hockey League KHL. The Timchenko Foundation promotes the development of the ice hockey and chess among young people.

In 2013, he became one of the sponsors and organisers of one of the most important international chess tournaments in the ELO rating – the Alekhine Memorial.

Awards
In 2013, he was appointed as a Chevalier of the Légion d'honneur for creating a permanent exhibition of Russian art in the Louvre, support for the Russian Museum in Saint Petersburg, and help in organizing the Alekhine Memorial chess tournament. This award prompted Russian political writer Andrey Piontkovsky to write that "awarding a criminal with nickname Gangrene the highest distinction brings shame to the French state".

See also
List of Russian billionaires
Russian oligarchs

Notes

References

External links

Biography by Vladimir Pribylovsky (in Russian).
Les bonnes affaires de Guennadi Timtchenko 
Timchenko's profile and assets on Russian Asset Tracker

1952 births
Living people
Russian oligarchs
Finnish businesspeople
Russian emigrants to Finland
Russian billionaires
Naturalized citizens of Finland
Russian-speaking Finns
Russian individuals subject to the U.S. Department of the Treasury sanctions
Russian individuals subject to European Union sanctions
People named in the Pandora Papers
Anti-Ukrainian sentiment in Russia